Ballinadee is a village in County Cork, Ireland. It lies in the parish of Courceys, approximately 12 km by road west of Kinsale and 9 km south east of Bandon. Ballinadee is on the banks of the River Pound, which flows into the River Bandon, and has a school, one shop and two pubs.

Built heritage 
Ballinadee Church, the local Anglican (Church of Ireland) church, has been in the centre of the village since 1759.

Sport 
Courcey Rovers GAA is the local Gaelic Athletic Association club based in Ballinspittle and Ballinadee. De Courcey Albion is the local soccer club, also based in Ballinspittle and Ballinadee.

People
 Liam Deasy (1896–1974), Irish Republican Army officer who fought in the Irish War of Independence and the Irish Civil War, was from the area.
 Tom Hales (1892–1966), Irish Republican Army volunteer and politician, was also born near Ballinadee.

See also
 List of towns and villages in Ireland

References

Towns and villages in County Cork